Elwood Floyd Yates (March 18, 1903 – August 31, 2010) was an American politician who served in the Virginia House of Delegates.

References

External links 

1903 births
2010 deaths
Members of the Virginia House of Delegates
20th-century American politicians